Tazmin Brits (born 8 January 1991) is a South African athlete and cricketer. She won gold in the javelin throw at the 2007 World Youth Championships in Athletics. She was in line to be selected for the 2012 Summer Olympics in London, before being involved in a road accident, which left her hospitalised for two months. She made her international debut for the South Africa women's cricket team in May 2018.

Career
In April 2018, she was named in South Africa women's cricket squad for the Women's Twenty20 International (WT20I) series against Bangladesh. Prior to the tour, she captained the South Africa Emerging Players Women's squad against Australia. She made her WT20I debut for South Africa against Bangladesh Women on 19 May 2018.

In February 2019, Cricket South Africa named her as one of the players in the Powerade Women's National Academy intake for 2019. In September 2019, she was named in the F van der Merwe XI squad for the inaugural edition of the Women's T20 Super League in South Africa. In July 2020, Brits was named as the CSA Women's Provincial Cricketer of the Year. On 23 July 2020, Brits was named in South Africa's 24-woman squad to begin training in Pretoria, ahead of their tour to England.

In January 2021, she was named in South Africa's Women's One Day International (WODI) squad for their series against Pakistan. She made her WODI debut for South Africa, against Pakistan, on 26 January 2021.

In February 2022, she was named in South Africa's team for the 2022 Women's Cricket World Cup in New Zealand. In May 2022, Cricket South Africa awarded Brits with her first central contract, ahead of the 2022–23 season. In July 2022, Brits was added to South Africa's team for the cricket tournament at the 2022 Commonwealth Games in Birmingham, England.

References

Further reading

External links

1991 births
Living people
People from Klerksdorp
South African female javelin throwers
South African women cricketers
South Africa women One Day International cricketers
South Africa women Twenty20 International cricketers
North West women cricketers
Cricketers at the 2022 Commonwealth Games
Commonwealth Games competitors for South Africa